Kozuchak is a village in the Talas Region of Kyrgyzstan. It is part of the Talas District. Its population was 1,873 in 2021.

References

Populated places in Talas Region